Fulletby is a village and a civil parish in the East Lindsey district of Lincolnshire, England. At the time of the 2011 census the population remained less than 100 and is included in the civil parish of Low Toynton.

History 
The village is listed in the 1086 Domesday Book.

In 1841 the village consisted primarily of mud-and-stud cottages. In 1849 six Roman funeral urns were dug up in the parish. They contained burned bone fragments; one contained a Roman coin. This area was occupied by the Romans from the 1st through 4th centuries, AD.

In 1885 Kelly's Directory reported that the area's chief crops were wheat, barley, oats and turnips. In addition to the Anglican church of St. Andrew, the village had both a Wesleyan and a Primitive Methodist chapel.

Fulletby Grade II listed Anglican church, dedicated to St Andrew, is in Early English style. The church was rebuilt in 1705, but its tower fell down in 1799. It was rebuilt again in 1865. The Church is now part of the Hemingby Group of the Horncastle Deanery and seats around 120.

References

External links

Villages in Lincolnshire
Civil parishes in Lincolnshire
East Lindsey District